Blizzard is the first EP of the French collective Fauve on their own Fauve Corp label.

It was released on May 20, 2013. The songs were known since 2011 on the web. Besides the CD and digital downloads, Vinyl LP was also released. The vinyl included a coupon to allow
free digital downloads for purchasers of the vinyl version.

Track listing

Charts

References

2013 EPs